Jabbor Rasulov District ( Nohiyai Jabbor Rasulov) is a district in Sughd Region, Tajikistan. Its capital is Mehrobod (former Proletarsk). The population of the district is 137,700 (January 2020 estimate).

Administrative divisions
They are as follows:

References

Districts of Tajikistan
Sughd Region